Ejido de Treinta y Tres is a populated rural area in the Treinta y Tres Department of eastern Uruguay. It is a less densely inhabited extension of the city of Treinta y Tres, sharing borders with it to its west, north and east.

Population
In 2011 Ejido de Treinta y Tres had a population of 6,782.
 
Source: Instituto Nacional de Estadística de Uruguay

References

External links
INE map of Treinta y Tres, Ejido de Treinta y Tres & Villa Sara

Populated places in the Treinta y Tres Department